Eoophyla acroperalis is a moth in the family Crambidae. It was described by George Hampson in 1897. It is found on Fergusson Island in Papua New Guinea.

References

Eoophyla
Moths described in 1897